Greyhound was a British reggae band.

Greyhound began as The Rudies in the late 1960s, with core members Danny Smith and Freddie Notes. They also released material as The Tilermen and Des All Stars. Under the name The Rudies, they issued a cover of "Patches" by Clarence Carter and also "Montego Bay" by Bobby Bloom. Billed as Freddie Notes and The Rudies, "Montego Bay" peaked at #45 in the UK Singles Chart in October 1970.  After Notes's departure, Glenroy Oakley joined the band and they changed their name to Greyhound in 1970. Their first single was an Earl Robinson/David I. Arkin composition, "Black & White", later recorded by artists as diverse as The Maytones, Sammy Davis Jr and Three Dog Night; Greyhound scored a Top Ten hit with the tune in the UK Singles Chart. Two more singles, including a cover of Henry Mancini's "Moon River" followed, before the group's fame faded.

Discography

Albums
Black and White (Trojan Records, 1972)
Leave the Reggae to Us (Mercury Records, 1975)
 Mango Rock (retitled UK release of Leave the Reggae to Us) (Transatlantic Records, 1976)

Charting singles
"Black and White" (1971) UK No. 6, AUS No. 88
"Moon River" (1971) UK No. 12, AUS No. 95
"I Am What I Am" (1972) UK No. 20, 
"Dream Lover" (1973) UK No. 53, AUS No. 24
"Jamaican Rum"

References

External links
"Greyhound - The Story behind "Black and White"" at marcoonthebass.blogspot.com

British reggae musical groups
Trojan Records artists
Mercury Records artists
Transatlantic Records artists